L'Étrange Désir de monsieur Bard, is a French drama film from 1954, directed by Géza von Radványi, written by Géza von Radványi, starring Michel Simon and Louis de Funès.

Plot 
Auguste Bard is a bus driver who lives alone because women don't find him attractive. He suffers with a heart condition and eventually he is told by his doctor that he has only a short time left to live. He decides to take an early retirement. Then he wins a huge amount of money at a casino and can afford to pay the professional dancer Donata to keep him company.

Cast 
 Michel Simon: Auguste Bard
 Yves Deniaud: Antonio
 Geneviève Page: Donata
 Georgette Anys: Julie
 Louis de Funès: Monsieur Chanteau
 Paul Demange: the nervous doctor
 Paul Frankeur: the priest
 Geneviève Page: Donata Francescati, the dancer
 Henri Crémieux: Ernest, the grocer
 Henri Arius: the commissioner
 Lucien Callamand: the notary
 Emma Lyonel: the directrices
 Colette Ricard: Béatrice, the daughter of Julie and Ernest
 Jacques Erwin: the bailiff at the casino
 François Carron: the doctor at the maternity ward
 Maurice Bénard: the casino manager 
 Yvonne Claudie: Caroline
 Félix Clément or Jean Clément: the first doctor
 Michel Gerbier: the little boy
 Claude Ermelli
 Colette Ravel
 Jacques Robin

References

External links 
 
 L’Étrange désir de Monsieur Bard (1953) at the Films de France
 L'Étrange Désir de monsieur Bard at Uni France films

1954 films
French drama films
1950s French-language films
French black-and-white films
Films directed by Géza von Radványi
Films with screenplays by René Barjavel
1954 drama films
1950s French films